Welford is a surname. Notable people with the surname include:

Colin Welford (born 1967), British conductor
James Welford (1869–1945), English cricketer and footballer
Nancy Welford (1904–1991), American actress
Rod Welford (born 1958), Australian politician
Tiffany Welford (born 1985), Australian tennis player
Walter Welford (1868–1952), English-born American politician
Walter Thompson Welford FRS (1916–1990), English physicist